Albot is a Moldovan surname. Notable people with the surname include:

Nata Albot (born 1979), Moldovan blogger, journalist, and producer
Radu Albot (born 1989), Moldovan tennis player

See also
Albor
Allot (surname)

Surnames of Moldovan origin